State Highway 12 (SH-12) or Arrah–Sasaram road is a state highway in Bihar state. It covers two major districts (Bhojpur district and Rohtas district) of Bihar state. This state highway starts from Ekawana village near Arrah and ends at Kuraich village near Sasaram.

Route
The route of SH-12 from north to south direction is as follows:

 Ekawana (near Arrah)
 Udwant Nagar
 Garhani
 Charpokhari
 Piro
 Bikramganj (Rohtas)
 Nokha
 Sasaram

Note: 
 from Arrah, national highway (NH-922) move west towards Buxar and east towards Koilwar, Bihta, Danapur and Patna.
 from Arrah, national highway (NH-319) move south-west towards Jagdishpur, Dinara, Kochas and Mohania.

References 

State Highways in Bihar